Both sides of the 2008 war between Russia and Georgia blamed each other for starting the war.

A number of reports and researchers (among them independent Russian experts) concluded that the conflict started much earlier than the Georgian military operation which began on 7 August at 23:35 and that Russia was responsible for the war. Some have argued that shelling carried out by South Ossetian separatists in early August was done to trigger a Georgian military response and therefore a Russian military intervention.

Combatants' positions

Georgia
Georgia first said that its military offensive responded to Ossetian shelling of Georgian villages, and it intended to "restore constitutional order" in South Ossetia. Georgia also said it aimed to counter a Russian invasion. During a United Nations Security Council meeting on 8 August, Georgia said that the first Russian troops entered South Ossetia at 5:30 am on 8 August. In a decree ordering the general mobilisation published on 9 August, Saakashvili noted that the Russian troops had advanced through the Roki tunnel on 8 August (after the Georgian attack). The Georgian government continued to maintain its position, saying that around 11:30 pm on 7 August intelligence information was received that 150 Russian army vehicles had entered Georgian territory through the Roki Tunnel. In an interview with Der Spiegel, Saakashvili said that he "wanted to stop the Russian troops before they could reach Georgian villages." "When our tanks moved toward Tskhinvali, the Russians bombed the city. They were the ones – not us – who reduced Tskhinvali to rubble." Georgia released intercepted telephone calls purporting to show that part of a Russian armoured regiment crossed into South Ossetia nearly a full day before Georgia's attack on the capital, Tskhinvali, late on August 7.

Russia
Russia says it acted to defend Russian citizens in South Ossetia, and its own peacekeepers stationed there. The Russian peacekeepers in South Ossetia allegedly suffered casualties during the war. According to a senior Russian official, the first Russian combat unit was ordered to move through the Roki Tunnel at around dawn of 8 August (after the Georgian attack had begun). Defending Russia's decision to launch attack in uncontested Georgia, Russian Foreign Minister Sergey Lavrov has said that Russia had no choice but to target the military infrastructure sustaining the Georgian offensive. Initially, Russia went as far as accusing Georgia of committing genocide against Ossetians. It was claimed that Georgia codenamed its attack Operation "Clear Field". Russia also claimed that Georgia was planning to launch a two-day Operation "Rock" to retake Abkhazia. Russia codenamed its military action "Operation to Force Georgia to Peace".

Three years after the August War, Russian President Dmitry Medvedev admitted NATO would have been expanded to admit ex-Soviet republics if Russia had not invaded Georgia in 2008 to defend a rebel region. "If you ... had faltered back in 2008, the geopolitical situation would be different now," Medvedev said in a speech to soldiers at a Vladikavkaz base. In August 2012, Vladimir Putin said that Russia had drawn up a plan to counter a Georgian attack long before the August 2008 conflict in the Caucasus. He said the plan was developed by the Russian General Staff in late 2006-early 2007 and it was negotiated with Putin, who was serving his second presidential term in that period. According to Putin, South Ossetian militia were trained under this plan. However, he refused to reveal if he insisted on the use of force when the war began.

South Ossetia
The South Ossetian government in Tskhinvali called for Russian help to prevent "genocide" when the Georgian bombardment began, saying that Tskhinvali was under "the most frightful fire".

Abkhazia
When Abkhazia launched a military operation to gain the Kodori Gorge, President Sergei Bagapsh said: "Maybe in order to achieve our goals we will have to violate certain parts of the Moscow Agreement of May 14, 1994 on a ceasefire but we were not the first to violate them."

Arrival of the Russian army in South Ossetia

Life Goes On (news article)

"Life Goes On" is an article published in the 3 September 2008 issue of the Russian Ministry of Defence's official newspaper, Krasnaya Zvezda. It was also posted on the newspaper's web site. The article was based on the interview of an officer who had taken part in the military operation in South Ossetia in August 2008. After the initial publication, it was picked up by blogs and internet news agencies, as it contradicted the official timeline of Russian incursion into South Ossetia. However, the article was later corrected. Soon, the article was pulled from the newspaper's web site, the disappearance having been commented upon by the mainstream media, including The New York Times. The article details the war experience of Russian captain of the 135th regiment named Denis Sidristy. He said that his unit had been ordered to cease a training exercise and move to Tskhinvali on August 7, and he was there when the hostilities broke out. Sidristy said that he witnessed the Georgian attack on Tskhinvali around midnight. After a query by The New York Times about the article, Krasnaya Zvezda later published an article in which Captain Sidristy said the correct date for the advance to Tskhinvali was August 8, not August 7.

Other reports by Russian media
On 4 August 2008, Life.ru reported that after the end of the "Kavkaz 2008" exercises, the paratroopers from Pskov remained to occupy the key positions on the Roki and Mamison passes on the border. Several battalions of 58th Army were moved close to the border. The South Ossetian sources told the newspaper that the deployment of troops began on the night of 2–3 August 2008. Life.ru reported, "The deployment of the Russian military hardware near the Roki tunnel will allow as soon as possible to move troops to help the peacemaking forces."

On 6 August 2008, OsRadio reported that the volunteers were also arriving in Tskhinvali from Moscow.

On 8 August 2008, Nezavisimaya Gazeta published an article by journalist who had spent previous three days in Chechnya. She saw the base of the Battalion "Vostok" in Gudermes somewhere in that time frame. Chechen soldiers were preparing to go to South Ossetia. It was claimed that they were going to support the peacekeeping mission. At 3:30 am they began departing with military official reminding them not to forget their passports and military IDs. However, the article does not mention that there was any war in South Ossetia.

On 12 August 2008, Komsomolskaya Pravda reported that in South Ossetia several soldiers were wounded and one was killed, who were from Tatarstan. Five days before he was killed in South Ossetia, Evgeny Parfenov warned his parents not to call him because it would be hard to reach him by phone. Lieutenant Aleksandr Popov was participating in the exercises on the height near Tskhinvali when his group was requested by the intelligence to reinforce them. According to Popov's mother, Popov told her he could see how the Georgians fired on Tskhinvali one week before the war. The mother of Eldar Lotfullin, 23-year-old contract soldier, said that she was able to call her son for the last time at around 10 pm MSK on 7 August 2008. Eldar Lotfullin told journalist that the Georgian tanks fired on his barracks on 8 August. On 13 August, Izvestia reported that the unit (where Popov served) was participating in the exercises in the mountains of South Ossetia.

On 12 August 2008, Moskovskij Komsomolets reported that one Russian regular army officer had said on 9 August that he was preparing for the exercises in South Ossetia, but understood only at the last minute that he was going to war.

On 12 August 2008, APN reported that the residents of North Ossetia–Alania were able to see the movement of a large number of troops towards the Roki Tunnel beginning 6 pm on 7 August, however they couldn't believe that Russia was involved in the war until the morning of 8 August.

In August 2008, Life.ru reported that "22-year old contract soldier died on the first day of the bloody aggression in the Georgian-South Ossetian conflict zone, when a barrage of fire hit the peaceful town." The soldier's mother said that his son called her on 7 August, but she did not know that he was in South Ossetia until his death.

On 15 August 2008, Permskie Novosti reported that a Russian soldier had called home on 10 August and told his mother: "We are there [in South Ossetia] since 7 August. All of our 58th army."

On 15 August 2008, Vyatksky krai reported that the sister of soldier Vitaly (who was fighting in South Ossetia) said that her brother called on 6 August and he was going to move [to unknown location]; later, on 7 August Vitaly told his sister that "we are going to the mountains."

On 15 August 2008, Komsomolskaya Pravda reported that 19-year-old Onar Aliev from the 19th Motor Rifle Division died in South Ossetia on the night of 8 August during the shelling of Tskhinvali. His mother said her son called for the last time on 4 August and told her that he would participate in the "true exercises" somewhere near Abkhazia.

On 15 August 2008, Trud made a report about junior sergeant Aleksandr Sviridov who was killed in South Ossetia. He called his mother on 2 August and said: "There won't be any holiday. There are intensified preparations; we frequently have parachute jumps. Apparently, we will be deployed to somewhere."

On 17 August 2008, Komsomolskaya Pravda reported that Aleksandr Plotnikov, the soldier from 693rd Regiment, said that he knew in early August that there would be war when two companies of his regiment were sent to the mountains near Tskhinvali.

In August 2008, Life.ru reported that 29-year Aleksey Tarasov, who was killed in action in South Ossetia, was buried in his village. His military friend was quoted as saying that their unit was allegedly deployed to South Ossetia for the exercises, but suddenly the war broke out.

On 26 August 2008, Drug dlya druga reported that one soldier's mother couldn't call her son for three days before 8 August because his phone was blocked (i.e. unreachable). At 3 am on 8 August her son was sent to Tskhinvali, where he was wounded.

On 27 August 2008, Vecherny Saransk reported that Yunir Bikkinyaev, contract soldier of 135th Regiment, stopped to answer the phone calls on 7 August and his parents were worried. He later acknowledged he did so not to frighten his family.

On 28 August 2008, Gazeta Yuga published a report about Zalim Gegraev, a wounded soldier from 1st company of the peacemaking battalion, who fought in South Ossetia. Gegraev's mother said that her son had told her that he was going to Tskhinvali before the war started. She also said that he had been to South Ossetia previously and when he was there, his phone did not work. Then Zalim spoke to journalist: "We had been there to participate in military exercises for a month in those areas before this. They ended, however we were not withdrawn. Then the order came to move to Tskhinvali. On 8 August we were near the town and waited for further instructions. I didn't even think that I could see such thing..."

On 1 September 2008, journalist of Nezavisimaya Gazeta wrote: "As early as 6 August I saw our army in full combat readiness near the Georgian border."

On 2 September 2008, it was reported that several soldiers' mothers had sent letter to Commissioner for Human Rights in Perm Krai. One mother wrote that on 3 August his son said his unit might be deployed to the border. Another mother said that his son told her on 9 August that his unit was sent to South Ossetia on the evening of 7 August.

On 11 September 2008, Yulia Latynina wrote that journalists who were sent in advance to cover the war reported on 6 August 2008 that they have seen "58th Army in full combat readiness on the other [Georgian] side of the Roki tunnel".

On 15 September 2008, Novaya Gazeta reported that the South Ossetian soldier had told journalist that after the end of "Kavkaz 2008" exercises 80 tanks remained in South Ossetia.

On 15 September 2008, RIA Novosti reported that Russian foreign minister Sergey Lavrov said: "There were excesses by all parties, but this was a war, and when you see on night, that you are being fired upon and you're on the move, while you're advancing to help Tskhinvali, then your response can not be precisely accurate and cannot avoid hurting anyone."

On 21 September 2008, Rossiya-1 TV reported that the wife of Lieutenant Sergey Shevelev, intelligence officer of the peacemaking battalion who died in South Ossetia, said that her husband called her every day and they talked casually. However, on 1 August he sent her text message saying "Everything is normal ... Watch TV. That's all."

In October 2008, Duel reported that soldier Maksim Pasko, who died near Gori on 12 August, sent several SMSes. One SMS was sent on 3 August 2008 and said: "Don't worry too much, the Georgian mercenaries are battering Tskhinvali. We were given orders to go there." Another SMS, sent on 5 August 2008, said: "Yesterday, our artillerists were messing with Georgia. 22 were killed and 150 injured."

In January 2009, Krasnaya Zvezda published an interview with the priest, Father Mikhail, who said: "I attended military exercise "Kavkaz-2008" in South Ossetia, where our paratroopers worked out the skills of combat in the mountains. Unfortunately, those skills became useful too soon..."

In May 2009, Rossiyskaya Gazeta reported that hero of Russia Denis Vetchinov, who died in South Ossetia, left the base of the Motor Rifle Division in Vladikavkaz for Tskhinvali on the early morning of 7 August 2008.

In June 2009, Russian General Vyacheslav Borisov told Echo of Moscow in an interview: "You know, we even regularly hold exercises in those areas. And our troops had full practice by holding exercises one week before right there in the same place. And we had only concluded and went. Therefore, marching toward Tskhinvali, we performed much better than those units under central command and the units of the district that were dusted off, did you know?"

In July 2009, Russian journalist Ella Polyakova wrote that some Russian soldiers had told her that they arrived in South Ossetia on 4 August 2008, while their records claimed that they were stationed in North Ossetia.

In July 2009, Russian blogger published an interview with soldier Maksim Belyaev, who said: "Our combined battalion of peacekeepers was stationed in North Ossetia. We should have replaced in August another battalion of the peacekeeping mission, located in Tskhinvali. We went to South Ossetia on the night of August 7. Around noon of 7 August, the column was near Tskhinvali on the bypass road."

In January 2010, Russian military portal Zaotechestvo.ru published the recollections of several Russian soldiers. Aleksandr Slanov, the head of the North Ossetian regional branch of "Union of Paratroopers", the NGO of veterans of the Airborne Forces and Special Forces, said: "In the night of 4–5 August, I and five other paratroopers left for Tskhinvali. We arrived at 5 AM." Tanker Vladimir said: "We arrived in Khetagurovo in the morning of 7 August. Our task was to destroy the Georgian fortified district, that was located on the height near Khetagurovo."

In 2012, Anatoly Khrulyov, the commander of the 58th Army, said in an interview that "For me, the war began in my workplace." He said that the decision to reinforce the Russian peacekeeping force was made on 5 August 2008. Khrulyov said that Marat Kulakhmetov, commander of the Combined Peacekeeping Forces called him on the night of 7–8 August and said that General Mamuka Kurashvili had warned him that Georgia was going to launch a large-scale military operation.

Reports by the Western media
On 18 August 2008, Le Figaro published the report by journalist who was told by a young Russian soldier at some checkpoint in Georgia that he came from Shali, Chechen Republic and that they left on 5 August 2008.

Georgian military interviews
Georgian soldiers told EurasiaNet that they thought their initial mission in South Ossetia was to stop attacks on Georgian villages. One senior lieutenant from 4th Brigade said: "Our goal was to put an end to fighting in the area and take control. Nobody in the army expected a war with Russia." One unnamed Georgian defense ministry source said: "The main thing is that the scope of the threat was underestimated, while our own combat capabilities were overestimated." Georgian military sources said that an attack had earlier been expected from Abkhazia, but not from South Ossetia. The 4th Brigade senior lieutenant said that they "were preparing for something in May when Georgia was denied NATO membership [a Membership Action Plan]," but there "were no preparations made" for a military operation in South Ossetia in August. "Many were on vacation and we were preparing to go Iraq in the fall."

On 7 August 2008, the 4th brigade loaded tanks and missile launchers on a train bound for the Georgian city of Gori. On the night of 7–8 August, the 4th Brigade launched a three-pronged offensive on South Ossetian positions in Tskhinvali and in two Ossetian villages - Znauri and Khetagurovo. One of the assaults intended to divert South Ossetian militia forces away from the main objective. After Tskhinvali was nearly encircled, Georgian troops then tried to establish control over a key road to the north, one mid-ranking commander said. The road was being defended by South Ossetian garrison near the village of Tbeti. As Georgian soldiers were engaged with the South Ossetian garrison, the first Russian tanks appeared, the commander said. "We destroyed one tank after another, but they kept coming," the anonymous commander said.

Phone intercepts
In September 2008, Georgia released recordings of intercepted phone calls to prove that the Russian military moved into South Ossetia before the Georgian military operation began. The New York Times made its own translation from the original Ossetian language into Russian and then into English. Senior American officials reviewed the recordings and considered them as "credible if not conclusive." The calls were made by Ossetian border guards on a Georgian cellular network. According to a call intercepted at 3:52 am on 7 August, a supervisor at the South Ossetian border guard headquarters asked a guard at the tunnel with the surname Gassiev: "Listen, has the armor arrived or what?" The guard replied: "The armor and people." Asked if they had gone through, he replied, "Yes, 20 minutes ago; when I called you, they had already arrived."

At 3:41 am, Gassiev told the supervisor in the first call that a Russian colonel had asked to inspect military vehicles that "crowded" the tunnel. Gassiev said: "The commander, a colonel, approached and said, ‘The guys with you should check the vehicles.’ Is that O.K.?" Asked about the identity of the colonel, Gassiev answered: "I don’t know. Their superior, the one in charge there. The BMP’s and other vehicles were sent here and they’ve crowded there. The guys are also standing around. And he said that we should inspect the vehicles. I don’t know. And he went out." Gassiev informed the supervisor at 3:52 am that armored vehicles had left the tunnel. They were commanded by a colonel Kazachenko.

Russia did not dispute veracity of the calls. According to Russian press reports after the war, Colonel Andrei Kazachenko who was mentioned in the recording, served in the 135th Motorized Rifle Regiment.

Russian Defense Ministry spokesman General Uvarov claimed that on 7 August Russian peacekeeping contingent in South Ossetia was supplied with fuel and products. Georgia disputed this Russian explanation, arguing that rotations of the Russian peacekeeping battalion could be conducted only in daylight and after not less than a month of advance notification according to a mutual agreement in 2004.

OSCE monitors
A former senior Organization for Security and Co-operation in Europe (OSCE) official, Ryan Grist, who was in charge of unarmed monitors in South Ossetia at war's start, told the BBC in November 2008 that he had been warning of Georgia's military activity before its move into the South Ossetia region, saying there was a "severe escalation" and that this "would give the Russian Federation any excuse it needed in terms of trying to support its own troops."

According to Grist, it was Georgia that launched the first military strikes against Tskhinvali. "It was clear to me that the [Georgian] attack was completely indiscriminate and disproportionate to any, if indeed there had been any, provocation,” he said. “The attack was clearly, in my mind, an indiscriminate attack on the town, as a town.” Grist's views were echoed by Stephen Young, who was another senior OSCE official in Georgia at the time. According to him, there had been no extensive shelling of the Georgian villages on the evening or night of August 7. Young added, that if there had been shelling of Georgian villages that evening, the OSCE monitors at the scene would have heard it. According to him, the monitors only heard occasional small arms fire.

Georgia, and some Western diplomats in Tbilisi later questioned Grist's objectivity. The OSCE curbed the attempts by The New York Times to interview the monitors, saying they would not be publicly engaged in disagreement. Terhi Hakala, head of the OSCE mission to Georgia, called the monitors' claims "a bit irrelevant." OSCE Deputy Spokeswoman Virginie Coulloudon told the journalists that the organization's monitors make "patrol reports" from the ground "on a daily basis." Coulloudon also said that "the OSCE is not in a capacity to say who started the war and what happened before the night of [August] 7-8." On 5 August 2008, the tripartite monitoring group, which included Organization for Security and Cooperation in Europe (OSCE) observers and representatives of Russian peacekeepers in the region, issued a report that said there was evidence of attacks against ethnic Georgian villages in South Ossetia. The report also stated that South Ossetian separatists were using heavy weapons against the Georgian villages, which was prohibited by a 1992 cease-fire agreement.

The Wall Street Journal (WSJ) wrote that in an interview Grist acknowledged he crossed through Russian lines without authorization on his own initiative to determine the facts, which ultimately cost him his OSCE job. He was forced to resign from the OSCE immediately after the war. WSJ adds Grist remains "scathing" about Georgian actions before and during the war, but says that some of his comments have been overinterpreted and quotes Grist saying "I have never said there was no provocation by the South Ossetians." "What I have said is that the response from the Georgian authorities was absolutely disproportionate," said Ryan Grist.

In an interview with The Wall Street Journal, Ryan Grist said that on 12 August he went to visit a friend in Tskhinvali, Lira Tskhovrebova, who was well connected with the separatist authorities. Friends took him to see two top South Ossetian officials. On the road to Tbilisi Grist was stopped by South Ossetian militia. He shouted the names of the officials he had just been meeting "so they wouldn't shoot" him. In December 2008, an investigation by the Associated Press revealed that Lira Tskhovrebova was not an independent activist as she claimed. She was allegedly connected to South Ossetian KGB and Russian intelligence agency, the FSB. Matthew Bryza, Deputy Assistant Secretary of State of the United States, also expressed his doubts about Tskhovrebova.

Georgian Parliamentary Commission Report
A Georgian parliamentary commission, which studied the war, released a report on 18 December 2008.

The report said in its beginning that Russia’s aggression against Georgia did not start in August 2008 and recalled the events in Abkhazia and South Ossetia in early 90s. The report then gave a detailed timeline of events preceding the war. It also said that the Georgian authorities' failure "to de-legitimize the presence of Russian peacekeepers can be considered the major shortcoming of the Georgian authorities in a pre-August period." The Russian peacekeepers were full-pledge participants of the aggression against Georgia, according to the commission. "On the one hand, Russia used ‘attack’ on ‘peacekeepers’ as one of the pretexts for launching the aggression and on the other hand, [attacks] were carried out on the Georgian citizens from their [peacekeepers’] headquarters [which was based on Tskhinvali]."

The report said that despite having information on tensions in the South Ossetian conflict zone, the Georgian authorities failed "to properly analyze" the scales of the threat. "The Georgian authorities perceived large-scale Russian military exercises at the Georgian borders in late July and continuing attacks in the conflict zone as a traditional wave of provocations." The report also criticized the National Security Council (NSC), "It is obvious that the Security Council has failed to plan the actions in a timely manner, which would have been adequate to the anticipated situation and consequently, from the morning of August 7 it had to act in force majeure regime." The commission said that the government members’ actions during the war sometimes lacked coordination. The report said that the government did not stick to the formal procedures laid out in the special decree envisaging setting up of a governmental commission during the emergency situations. The commission also criticized the Georgian Foreign Ministry, saying that "there is no special action plan and written instructions for ambassadors on how to act in the emergency situations; the activities of ambassadors are not controlled properly either."

The report also says that "serious shortcomings" were revealed in the defense system. The commission said that "problems persisted in the communication system." It also said that the war revealed "inadequacy" of the reserve troops system. "The Defense Ministry has failed to carry out strategic planning properly," the report continued.

The commission called on the General Prosecutor’s Office to investigate all the cases of violation of international humanitarian law regardless of who has committed them on either side.

EU Independent Fact Finding Mission Report
An independent, international fact-finding mission headed by Swiss diplomat Heidi Tagliavini was established by the EU to determine the causes of the war. The commission was given a budget of €1.6 million and relied on the expertise of military officials, political scientists, historians and international law experts. The report was published on 30 September 2009. The report said it could not claim "veracity or completeness in an absolute sense", since it incorporated what had been available to the Mission at the time of writing.

The report blamed Georgia for starting the war, stating that open hostilities started "... with a large-scale Georgian military operation against the town of Tskhinvali and the surrounding areas, launched in the night of 7 to 8 August 2008" although it noted that "... any explanation of the origins of the conflict cannot focus solely on the artillery attack on Tskhinvali in the night of 7/8 August" since "... it was only the culminating point of a long period of increasing tensions, provocations and incidents", and there was "... no way to assign overall responsibility for the conflict to one side alone." The Georgian reaction to South Ossetian attacks on Georgian villages before August 7 were found to be necessary and proportionate.

The beginning of the armed conflict between Georgia and South Ossetia was dated by the commission to 7 August 2008 at 23.35; however, the commission acknowledged that "a violent conflict had already been going on before in South Ossetia," and "President Saakashvili’s order on 7 August 2008 at 23.35 and the ensuing military attack on Tskhinvali [...] has to be seen as but one element in an on-going chain of events for military violence had also been reported before the outbreak of the open hostilities on 7 August 2008." The open hostilities between Georgia and Russia are considered to have begun on 8 August 2008. The report acknowledged that "volunteers or mercenaries" entered Georgia from Russia before the Georgian military operation and there was the presence of "some" non-peacekeeping Russian troops in South Ossetia before the public decision for an intervention was made by the Russian leadership.

The report stated that "there was no ongoing armed attack by Russia before the start of the Georgian operation. Georgian claims of a large-scale presence of Russian armed forces in South Ossetia prior to the Georgian offensive could not be substantiated by the mission. It could also not be verified that Russia was on the verge of such a major attack."

The commission said that a government "is generally not prevented" from using armed force in internal conflicts, e.g. against insurgents starting a civil war or against violent secessionists. However, the report said that Georgia had a non-use of force commitment under the legally binding international documents, such as the 1992 Sochi Agreement and 1996 Memorandum on Measures to Provide Security and Strengthen Mutual Trust between the Sides in the Georgian-South Ossetian Conflict.

The commission said that the South Ossetian attacks on Georgian villages (Zemo Nikozi, Kvemo Nikozi, Avnevi, Nuli, Ergneti, Eredvi and Zemo Prisi) were equivalent to an "attack by the armed forces of a State on the territory of another State" resembling the situations described in Art. 3(a) of UN Resolution 3314. As the South Ossetian attacks were "primarily" directed against Georgian peacekeepers and against Georgian police, this was an attack by the South Ossetian armed forces on the land forces of Georgia. The commission also said "To the extent that South Ossetian militia initiated the shooting on Georgian villages, police and peacekeepers before the outbreak of the armed conflict," South Ossetia violated the prohibition of the use of force. It also noted that Georgian attack on 7 August was a response, albeit not proportionate, to South Ossetian attacks in the following paragraphs:

As far as legality of use of force by Russia was concerned, the report took a "differentiated" approach, dividing "the Russian reaction to the Georgian attack" into two phases – the one, which was the immediate reaction "in order to defend Russian peacekeepers" in Tskhinvali and the second one, "the invasion of Georgia by Russian armed forces reaching far beyond the administrative boundary of South Ossetia", which was "beyond the reasonable limits of defence".

The commission stated that an attack by Georgian forces on Russian peacekeepers deployed in Georgia – "if not in self-defence against a Russian attack", would not be justified. However, the commission concluded that an attack on Russian peacekeepers was not a sufficient condition to be used for self-defence by Russia and "the fact of the Georgian attack on the Russian peacekeepers’ basis could not be definitely confirmed by the mission." The commission said that Russian peacekeepers, if they "had been directly attacked", had the right to immediate, necessary and proportionate response. However, "doubts remain whether the Russian peacekeepers were attacked in the first place," and the mission could not establish whether, at the time of the alleged attacks on Russian peacekeepers’ bases, the peacekeepers had lost their protection due to their participation in the hostilities. The commission concluded that the expulsion of the Georgian forces from South Ossetia, and the defence of South Ossetia as a whole was not a legitimate objective, and according to international law, the Russian actions as a whole, were not neither "necessary nor proportionate" to protect Russian peacekeepers in South Ossetia. The commission concluded that Russia did not have the right to justify its actions as "a mere reinforcement and fulfilment" of its peacekeeping mission.

The commission concluded that the South Ossetian separatists could not validly invite Russia to support them militarily. It also concluded that "Russian military activities against the Georgian military forces were not justified as collective self-defence under international law." The commission also concluded that Russian military actions also could not be justified as a humanitarian intervention.

The report further stated that Russian citizenship, conferred to the vast part of Abkhaz and Ossetians can not be considered legally binding under international law. The purportedly naturalised Abkhazs and South Ossetians are not Russian nationals according to international law. The commission said that the constitutional obligation to protect Russian nationals could not serve as a justification for intervention under international law. Russian domestic law could not be invoked as a justification for a breach of an international law. The commission concluded that Russian intervention in Georgia was not justified as a rescue operation for Russian citizens in Georgia.

With respect to the war's second theater, the report found the joint Abkhaz-Russian attack on the Kodori Gorge was unjustified under international law and was an illegal use of force. Russian support of Abkhazia was not justified as collective self-defence in favour of Abkhazia, because third-party involvement in an internal military conflict in support of the seceding party is not allowed. The commission concluded: "The use of force by Abkhazia was not justified under international law and was thus illegal. The same applies to the Russian support for Abkhaz use of force." General Russian involvement in the conflict in Georgia was a violation of the fundamental international legal prohibition of the use of force.

The report found that Russian and South Ossetian allegations of genocide committed by the Georgian side were "neither founded in law nor substantiated by factual evidence." The report found that during the conflict "all sides to the conflict - Georgian forces, Russian forces and South Ossetian forces - committed violations of International Humanitarian Law and Human Rights Law." The report also found facts of ethnic cleansing of Georgians, saying that "several elements suggest the conclusion that ethnic cleansing was indeed practised against ethnic Georgians in South Ossetia both during and after the August 2008 conflict." The commission said that in many cases Russian forces did not act to prevent or stop South Ossetian forces from committing acts of deliberate violence against civilians during the conflict and after the cease-fire.

The report also concluded that South Ossetia and Abkhazia did not have a right to secede from Georgia (which they did in the early 1990s), because according to the uti possidetis principle, only constituent republics such as Georgia, but not territorial sub-units such as South Ossetia or Abkhazia had the right to independence during the breakup of the Soviet Union. Their recognition was "consequently" contrary to international law.

Reception 
In February 2009, a high-ranking Georgian official suspected that one German expert, that submitted a research paper to Tagliavini, worked for organizations financed by Russian energy company Gazprom.

In September 2009, before the report was published, former Estonian Prime Minister Mart Laar said in an interview: "[They seem to be] looking at things from a very, we can say, interesting point of view, forgetting history, forgetting context, and forgetting one simple point: that during the war, no Georgian soldier, no plane, no other military equipment left the legal, internationally recognized territory of Georgia. It was Georgian territory, and no Georgian soldier [left] the borders of Georgia."

Before the report was published, a spokesman for Russia’s Foreign Ministry, Igor Lyakin-Frolov, said the Russian side had been "absolutely fair and honest" with Tagliavini's commission and felt optimistic about the report's objectivity. He said Russia was hoping that the commission would allocate blame to the countries that helped arm Georgia, in particular Ukraine. He added that Russia would consider it "unfair" if the investigation divided blame for the war equally.

EU countries declared in a statement the report was not about apportioning blame, but they stated it could "contribute toward a better understanding of the origins and the course of last year's conflict".

Georgian state minister for reintegration told the BBC that, although most of the facts in the report were accurate, he disagreed with some parts of it. "I disagree with the notion that Georgia used excessive force in the attack on Tskhinvali because, as I mentioned, there are ample evidences of Russian deployment and these were not just peacekeepers, so one can hardly judge what is proportionate," said Temur Iakobashvili. "One can hardly judge what is proportionate or disproportionate in this case."

Svante E. Cornell argued that although Tagliavini’s report did claim that Georgia started the war, that should not be confused with the question of responsibility. He also criticised the argument that Georgia was legally bound by agreements not to use force, because the mission failed to discuss their validity if broken by either the South Ossetians or by Russia. Cornell also criticised the report for not taking account of the considerable evidence accumulated by scholars such as Andrey Illarionov.

In 2010, Yulia Latynina, Russian journalist, criticised the Tagliavini report, saying: "A war, it turns out, is begun by he [sic] who responds to the actions of an aggressor [...]. So when Ossetian 'volunteers' burn Georgian villages - that is not a war. But if they [the Georgians] respond to this, then here you, accursed ones, have started a war. Following the logic of the Tagliavini commission, the Georgians ought not to have responded. Even if Russian tanks had reached Tbilisi, and the Georgians had responded, they, the swine, would have started a war. The logic is irreproachable: if the Georgians had not responded, there would have been no war." Latynina argued that according to the Tagliavini mission "Georgia had no right to send a single shell into the city [of Tskhinvali]. But the opposite side had a right to burn down Nuli, and that was not an infringement of human rights." Latynina concluded that the commission showed a "cowardice" before "an international hooligan" Vladimir Putin.

John B. Dunlop concluded that the EU report would have come to different conclusions (who and when began the war) if it had taken into consideration Andrey Illarionov's findings and documented timeline.

The role of Russian peacekeepers

In October 2008, Konstantin Timerman, the commander of the Russian peacekeeping battalion said in an interview with Izvestia that on the morning of 8 August the Russians opened fire in response only after the Georgians had opened fire on the observer post in the southern part of Tskhinvali.

In 2009, the Russian side told the Tagliavini commission that the Russian peacekeepers suffered the first casualties at 6:35 am on 8 August, when the Georgian tank was firing on the observer post on the roof of the peacekeepers' base. As a result one soldier of the battalion died, another one was wounded and the part of the building was destroyed. By noon two peacekeepers had died and five were wounded. Georgia said that it only targeted Russian peacekeepers in self-defence, after coming under fire from them.

WikiLeaks
After the disclosure of alleged US diplomatic cables by WikiLeaks, the dispatches sent during the initial stage of the war from Tbilisi were published. Former US Ambassador to Georgia John F. Tefft alleged that the Georgians did not intend to start the conflict, but rather were dragged into the war. The diplomat’s cables were initially published by Russian Reporter magazine, a Moscow-based weekly.

“From evidence available to us it appears the South Ossetians started today’s fighting,” reads an alleged August 8 dispatch from Tefft. “The Georgians are now reacting by calling up more forces and assessing their next move. It is unclear to the Georgians, and to us, what the Russian angle is and whether they are supporting South Ossetians, or actively trying to help control the situation.” He reportedly wrote on August 8 that “As late as 22:30 Georgian Ministry of Defense and Ministry of Foreign Affairs officials were still hopeful that the unilateral cease-fire announced by President Saakashvili will hold. Only when the South Ossetians opened up with artillery on Georgian villages, did the offensive to take Tskhinvali begin.” “All evidence available to the country team supports [Georgian President Mikheil] Saakashvili’s statement that this fight was not Georgia’s original intention,” reads the cable. “Key Georgian officials, who would have had responsibility for an attack on South Ossetia have been on leave, and the Georgians only began mobilizing August 7 once the attack was well underway.”

The cables also describe the chronology of events. On 7 August, when the fighting escalated, Deputy Foreign Minister Grigol Vashadze told the US Ambassador that "heavy Russian equipment was being moved south from Java - a military base north of the conflict zone, which Georgians have not seen -- even in tense times -- in the past." When General Kulakhmetov, the Head of the Russian peacekeepers in Tskhinvali, met with Temur Iakobashvili, Kulakhmetov said that he "does not control anything" and that the South Ossetians were "shooting at the Georgians behind my back."

EurasiaNet.org contacted the US Embassy in Kyiv, where Tefft then served, in an attempt to confirm the veracity of the cables. But the embassy declined to comment. Several Russian commentators have interpreted the same cables differently, saying that this proved that the Georgians started the war.

Statements by Commanders-in-chief

 On 11 August 2008, Georgian president Mikheil Saakashvili wrote: "The Kremlin designed this war. Earlier this year, Russia tried to provoke Georgia by effectively annexing another of our separatist territories, Abkhazia. When we responded with restraint, Moscow brought the fight to South Ossetia. Ostensibly, this war is about an unresolved separatist conflict. Yet in reality, it is a war about the independence and the future of Georgia. And above all, it is a war over the kind of Europe our children will live in. Let us be frank: This conflict is about the future of freedom in Europe."

 On 24 August 2008, Georgian president Mikheil Saakashvili had a lengthy televised speech. He remembered that after 2004 Adjara crisis he phoned President Putin and thanked him. "I remember that conversation very well; in response to my polite remarks, he said roughly: ‘Now remember, in Adjara we did not intervene, but you won’t have any gifts from us in South Ossetia or Abkhazia.’ That’s what he said to me." He then said "I suppose that Russia started thinking about military intervention in Georgia sometime in 2007." "[In July 2007] Russia announced a withdrawal from the Conventional Forces in Europe Treaty, limiting military forces in [Europe] and the Caucasus." Saakashvili then slammed the EU’s reaction to Russia’s admission of violating Georgian airspace in July 2008. "This admission by Russia was a clear sign that they were testing western reaction," he stated. Saakashvili said that his first meeting with Medvedev in June 2008 in St. Petersburg was good; while at the next meeting with Medvedev in Astana in July 2008, the Russian president’s stance was changed and "it was clear that they [Russia] were preparing for something bad." Saakashvili said that Georgia had expected a Russian attack from Abkhazia, rather than from South Ossetia, so major forces of the Georgian army were deployed in the Georgia's west. He said that as the situation deteriorated on 7 August, "we moved one brigade [of the Georgian armed forces] closer to South Ossetia, and later another [brigade] as well." "But our major forces were still deployed in the west; there was a brigade at Senaki [a military base] and we did not call back our brigade from Iraq, because I was deeply convinced up to the last minute that Russia would not engage in such a large-scale provocation," he said. "Although we were under fire from 120mm mortar launchers, I announced a unilateral ceasefire; at that time we already had one dead soldier in the village of Avnevi and four others were wounded; [Georgian Defense Minister Davit] Kezerashvili was begging me to let him open artillery fire, because, he was telling me, otherwise he was unable to bring [the wounded soldiers] from [the village]. But my response was that we could not open fire whatever happened," he said. Saakashvili also said that the Russian army had moved into South Ossetia before the war had even started. "When we ask our western partners: didn't you see them coming, they respond that their satellites were directed mainly on Iraq and that they could not fly over [Georgia], but it was impossible to see what was happening on the ground because it was cloudy. So it was a serious failure of international intelligence services; they would not have hidden this information from us, if they had known it; but they also did not know it," Saakashvili said.

 In late August 2008, Georgian president Saakashvili said that he expected threat from Abkhazia and had most of the troops stationed near Abkhazia, adding: "I can tell you that if we'd intended to attack, we'd have withdrawn our best-trained forces from Iraq up front." He also said: "Some months ago, I was warned by Western leaders in Dubrovnik to expect an attack this summer."

 On 1 October 2008, Dmitry Medvedev said: "During this time we demonstrated that Russia is a state that can defend its citizens and whose opinions should be taken into consideration by various countries, including by those that protect themselves by making friends with greater states."

 In November 2008, Georgian president Mikheil Saakashvili at a conference in Riga, claimed that the August conflict in the Caucasus began in Ukraine when the Russian Black Sea Fleet left the base six days before the large-scale hostilities broke out. According to him, Ukrainian president Viktor Yushchenko tried unsuccessfully to stop the Russian fleet.

 In December 2008, Georgian President Saakashvili declared: "I have always openly acknowledged that I ordered military action in South Ossetia -- as any responsible democratic leader would have done, and as the Georgian Constitution required me to do in defense of the country. I made this decision after being confronted by two facts. First, Russia had massed hundreds of tanks and thousands of soldiers on the border between Russian and Georgia in the area of South Ossetia. (...) Second, for a week Russian forces and their proxies engaged in a series of deadly provocations, shelling Georgian villages that were under my government's control -- with much of the artillery located in Tskhinvali, often within sites controlled by Russian peacekeepers. Then, on Aug. 7, Russia and its proxies killed several Georgian peacekeepers." He also said that when the crisis began to escalate, he tried to call Russian President Dmitry Medvedev on both August 6 and 7, but he did not answer.

 In August 2011, Dmitry Medvedev said: "The moment of truth for me, as I realized later while analyzing those events in hindsight over and over again, came with the visit by Secretary of State Condoleezza Rice." "Following that visit, my Georgian colleague simply dropped all communication with us. He simply stopped talking to us, he stopped writing letters and making phone calls. It was apparent that he had new plans now. And those plans were implemented later." Medvedev also said that he decided to attack Georgia without consulting Prime Minister Vladimir Putin, and that the two did not have a conversation until the following day.

 On 8 August 2012, Russian Prime minister Dmitry Medvedev said: "Yes, we had our own relations with South Ossetia and Abkhazia, nonetheless considering in that moment Georgia's territorial integrity, however we had understood too that this was practically impossible." "I made my decision two-and-a-half hours after the Georgian army began the active fighting. Not earlier, because this was wrong, since this was the decision to use the Armed Forces of the Russian Federation on foreign soil, I underline, the foreign territory. But not later too," he said. He also said that he contacted Putin on 8 August.

 In 2014, former president of Georgia, Mikheil Saakashvili published an article in The Guardian where he wrote that for months prior to August 2008, "unidentified troops" "grabbed more and more control over Georgia's separatist regions, and were getting into a growing number of shooting matches with local law enforcement." According to him, Russian tank columns started to move into Georgia to the point when, on 7 August 2008, the Georgian armed forces were compelled to respond. Saakashvili claimed that if Georgia had not responded, Russian special forces could have easily reached Tbilisi within 24 hours. He claimed that he "couldn't afford to wait." By military response he managed "to gain time, raise the stakes, and ultimately save ... statehood and democracy." He pointed out if the west had reacted "properly" to the war in Georgia, "Ukraine would never have happened."

Statements by politicians
 On 7 August, state-owned Rossiya TV showed Sergei Bagapsh, the president of Abkhazia, speaking at a meeting of the Abkhaz National Security Council. Bagapsh said: "I have spoken to the president of South Ossetia. It has more or less stabilized now. A battalion from the North Caucasus District has entered the area." By the evening of 7 August, Bagapsh had ordered the Abkhaz armed forces to raise combat readiness.

 On 7 August 2008, Assistant Secretary of State Daniel Fried said: "It appears that the South Ossetians have instigated this uptick in violence." "We have urged the Russians to urge their South Ossetian friends to pull back and show greater restraint. And we believe that the Russians ... are trying to do just that." Fried did not think the Russians had encouraged the South Ossetians to stir unrest. "There's no evidence that the Russians are pushing them," he stated.

 On 8 August 2008, Swedish Minister for Foreign Affairs Carl Bildt said that the crisis was due to provocations from the South Ossetian side and that Georgian forces were trying to restore "the constitutional order". On 9 August, Bildt evoked the memory of Adolf Hitler in condemning Russia's attack on Georgia, saying the protection of Russian citizens does not justify the invasion. "No state has the right to intervene militarily in the territory of another state simply because there are individuals there with a passport issued by that state or who are nationals of the state," he also said. "Attempts to apply such a doctrine have plunged Europe into war in the past... And we have reason to remember how Hitler used this very doctrine little more than half a century ago to undermine and attack substantial parts of central Europe".

 A UN Security Council diplomat said: "Strategically, the Russians have been sending signals that they really wanted to flex their muscles, and they’re upset about Kosovo."

 In late August 2008, Batu Kutelia, the deputy defence minister told the Financial Times that Georgia made the decision to seize Tskhinvali despite the fact that Georgia did not have enough anti-tank and air defences to protect itself against the possibility of serious resistance. He said that "At some point there was no choice." He also said that Georgia did not believe Russia would respond to its offensive against South Ossetia and was completely unprepared for the counter-attack that followed. "I didn't think it likely that a member of the UN Security Council and the OSCE would react like this," he said.

 In August 2008, Modest Kolerov, former head of the Department for international and cultural ties with foreign countries of the President’s Office, admitted that the Kremlin had "a clear plan of action in the case of a conflict", and "the expediency with which the military operation was executed confirms that."

 In August 2008, Vadim Kozaev, employee of Ministry of Internal Affairs of North Ossetia–Alania, and his brother Vladislav Kozaev, hero of Abkhazia and South Ossetia, alleged that Eduard Kokoity, the president of South Ossetia, knew in advance that the war was coming and fled Tskhinvali.

 In August 2008, Steven Pifer, former Ambassador to Ukraine, said that Russian rhetoric and media narrative suggested they were preparing a large-scale operation. "The rhetoric that is coming out of Moscow, ethnic cleansing and genocide, is just way over the top," he said. "It's almost approaching the point where there is just no relationship to reality. But again, certainly the rhetoric is appropriate to a larger operation against Georgia to just stop and reverse whatever military gains the Georgians made in South Ossetia on [August 7]." Pifer said that Russia laid a well-prepared trap and the Georgians took the bait. "The Georgian leadership made a mistake on [August 7]. They should have understood from what they have seen from the Russians that the Russians were looking for a pretext. They [the Georgians] gave them that pretext when they decided to go in a fairly large way into South Ossetia," he said. "The speed of the Russian response suggests that the Russians were ready, they were just waiting for the reason and they took that as the reason."

 On 8 September 2008, Dana Rohrabacher (a senior Republican member of the United States House of Representatives) Foreign Affairs Committee, argued at a House of Representatives Foreign Affairs Committee meeting, according to The Daily Telegraph, that Georgia started the fighting on August 7, citing unidentified intelligence sources. Further, Telegraph reported that "Mr Rohrbacher insisted that Georgia was to blame", citing him: "The Georgians broke the truce, not the Russians, and no amount of talk of provocation and all this other stuff can alter that fact." Telegraph stated: "His comments got little attention in the United States but have been played prominently on state-run Russian television bulletins and other media."

 In September 2008, Russian Prime Minister Vladimir Putin told reporters that Russia had no choice but to attack Georgia as Russia had been encircled on all sides. He said that Georgia "attacked South Ossetia with missiles, tanks, heavy artillery and ground troops. What were we supposed to do?" He claimed that if his country had not invaded, it would have been like Russia "getting a bloody nose and hanging its head down", and there would be a "second blow" into the North Caucasus. He insisted that President Dmitry Medvedev, not he, took all decisions regarding the conflict.

 After the war, Irakli Okruashvili, who served as Defense Minister of Georgia, claimed that he and President Saakashvili had drawn up plans to retake South Ossetia and Abkhazia in 2005, Abkhazia being the strategic priority. The alleged original plans called for a two-pronged offensive into South Ossetia aimed at taking Tskhinvali, the Roki Tunnel, and Java. Saakashvili believed that the United States would block a response by Russia through diplomatic channels, so he did not order the taking of the Roki Tunnel. When Russian forces responded, Georgian forces raced to contain them, but were outmaneuvered by the Russians. Okruashvili said that Russian response would be "inevitable" as after 2006, Russians repositioned and improved their military infrastructure in the North Caucasus, Abkhazia, and South Ossetia. The Georgian Army could have defended a few key towns from the Russians, but President Saakashvili "let the Russians in to avoid criticism and appear more of a victim".

 In September 2008, Matthew Bryza, the deputy assistant secretary of State, said the contents of the recorded phone conversations (which were presented as evidence of Russian invasion on 7 August) were consistent with what Georgians believed on August 7, in the final hours before the war, when a cease-fire collapsed. "During the height of all of these developments, when I was on the phone with senior Georgian officials, they sure sounded completely convinced that Russian armored vehicles had entered the Roki Tunnel, and exited the Roki Tunnel, before and during the cease-fire," he stated. "I said, under instructions, that we urge you not to engage these Russians directly." Bryza had also said earlier in August 2008, "They felt they had to defend the honor of their nation and defend their villages. It was a very dangerous dynamic. That was part of an action-reaction, 'Guns of August' scenario that we tried to defuse."

 On 18 September 2008, the U.S. Secretary of State Condoleezza Rice said: "On August 7th, following repeated violations of the ceasefire in South Ossetia, including the shelling of Georgian villages, the Georgian government launched a major military operation into Tskhinvali and other areas of the separatist region."

 In September 2008, President Lech Kaczyński said in an interwiew that Georgia's decision to launch operation against South Ossetia was provoked: "This mistake was provoked. There was a test of strength, and Russia showed the face it wanted to show—an imperial face. Ukraine is now threatened. We won't see the rebirth of the Warsaw Pact and the Soviet Union. This is just the old Russia."

 In late October 2008, French Foreign Minister Bernard Kouchner in his interview with Kommersant said that during the war "there was a real danger of regime change in Georgia". He also said that "...Russia without question was prepared. Russian troops, by some miracle, turned up on the border at the right time." He stated that the next hot spots could become Crimea, Ukraine and others.

 On 28 October 2008, Brigadier general Mamuka Kurashvili, a Georgian MoD official, testified before the parliamentary commission studying the Russo-Georgian war and said that his remarks on the launch of military operations on August 7, describing it as an effort "to restore constitutional order," were not authorized by superiors and were "impulsive." Kurashvili's interview with a Georgian TV on 7 August was the first statement made by a Georgian official indicating that Tbilisi had launched an operation against the breakaway region. "It [the statement] was not agreed with anybody and I had no instruction from anybody [to make that statement]," Kurashvili told the commission. He added that "I had just come out from the battle when a journalist approached me... I was confused." He also stated that Russian commander Marat Kulakhmetov’s statements made during the early stage of the conflict about his inability to control the South Ossetian militias was a lie.

 On 25 November 2008, Erosi Kitsmarishvili, Georgia's former ambassador to Russia, gave a testimony to a parliamentary commission in which he said that Georgian authorities were preparing for the conflict. According to Kitsmarishvili, Georgian officials told him in April 2008 that they planned to start a war in Abkhazia and that they had received a green light from the United States government to do so. He said that the Georgian government later decided to start the war in South Ossetia and continue into Abkhazia. According to him, "Russia was ready for this war, but the Georgian leadership started the military action first."

 A report prepared for the British House of Lords comes to the conclusion that "The precise circumstances surrounding the August 2008 outbreak of the conflict are not yet clear but responsibility for the conflict was shared, in differing measures, by all the parties. There is evidence of a Russian military build-up prior to the August war. In addition, Russia’s use of force was disproportionate in response to provocative statements and military action by President Saakashvili. President Saakashvili seems to have drawn unfounded confidence in confronting Russia as a result of mixed signals from the US Administration. The origins of the conflict lie in both distant and more recent history in the region, involving population transfers, national grievances, commercial, political and military interests."

 In July 2009, Alexander Bastrykin, Chairman of the Investigative Committee of the Prosecutor General's Office, told journalists that the investigation of the war was almost complete. However, the guilt of Georgian president Mikheil Saakashvili in instigating the conflict in South Ossetia could not be proven.

 In September 2009, Václav Havel, the first president of the Czech Republic, and other European politicians and thinkers wrote: "First, a big power will always find or engineer a pretext to invade a neighbour whose independence it resents. We should remember that Hitler accused the Poles of commencing hostilities in 1939, just as Stalin pinned the blame on the Finns when he invaded their country in 1940. Similarly, in the case of Georgia and Russia, the critical question is to determine which country invaded the other, rather than which soldier shot the first bullet."

 In 2011, Condoleezza Rice, former Secretary of State, told The Weekly Standard that she was "worried that the Russians would provoke [Georgian president Mikheil] Saakashvili and that he would allow himself to be provoked. But in no way were the Georgians at fault..." She said: "They were doing all kinds of things to try to provoke the Georgians. The shelling of Georgian cities by the South Ossetians, Russian allies, is clearly what started the war." Rice also talked about Russian hatred for Georgians.

 On 5 August 2012, a new documentary "A Lost Day" (Russian: "Потерянный день") was released on YouTube. The authors of the documentary were unknown. Several high-ranking military officials were featured. Yuri Baluyevsky, former Chief of the General Staff of Russia said that President Dmitry Medvedev didn't want to make a decision to go to war for some time. Baluyevsky said that it was Putin that had ordered to "retaliate" militarily against Georgia "after the first tensions", however "high-level officials" in Moscow had the fear of responsibility "until a kick in one place from Vladimir Vladimirovich in Beijing followed." Baluyevsky said that Putin made a decision to invade Georgia before Medvedev became President in May 2008 and a detailed military plan was worked out and specific orders were issued in advance.

 On 8 August 2012, Russian president Vladimir Putin said that the intense fighting began on 6 August 2008. "The information what was happening at the time of the 5th, 6th, 7th and 8th of the (August 2008), I received directly from Tskhinvali. Oddly enough, from journalists. Because the journalists had taken to my press secretary, Dmitry Peskov, and he came to me and, with reference to them, the witnesses of events taking place there, informed of hostilities," he said. Putin also underlined that not one day, but three days passed before the decision was made to send troops to South Ossetia. Asked about his personal role, Putin said, "While in Beijing, I called Dmitry Medvedev and the defense minister twice, on August 7 and 8." Putin's statement about his phone talks with Medvedev after the outbreak of large-scale hostilities contradicted Medvedev's 2011 statement that he had no phone talks with Putin and they had contact only the next day. Putin's statement on Russia having a plan since 2006 contradicted earlier claims that Russia acted in response to Georgia's "surprise attack" to prevent a "genocide" and to defend Russian citizens.

 In August 2012, several South Ossetian officials told Vzglyad that the war began on 1 August.

 In June 2013, Russian president Vladimir Putin said in a television interview that Russia attacked Georgia because the Georgian government was smuggling terrorists across Abkhazia to the Russian border near Sochi. "About six or seven years ago when we had to attack Georgian territories, those were not just strikes on Georgia. We targeted militant groups that came very close to Sochi. … Georgian police vehicles were transporting the militants to the Russian border. So we had to take some pre-emptive measures. And I informed the president [Dmitry Medvedev] about this," he said.

 In 2013, sources connected with Swedish intelligence told newspaper Svenska Dagbladet, that Sweden's National Defence Radio Establishment (FRA) predicted that war between Russia and George would break out before the US did. "We could see how the Russians moved military units and how things then became silent. That meant everything was in place and that the final preparations for a strike were underway," one of the sources said. The source added: "We knew that Russia would likely enter Georgia. At the same time, the US drew a different conclusion: that there would be no war."

 In 2014, Daniel Fata, who served as deputy assistant secretary of defense for European and NATO policy in Pentagon from September 2005 to September 2008, said that Putin gave assurances to the United States over Georgia in 2008 that his intervention was limited in scope and designed to protect Russian citizens. But Putin lied, because his intention all along was to bring down the government of President Mikheil Saakashvili. Although Saakashvili was not deposed, his standing was weakened by the war. The United States was concerned about potential Russian aggression in South Ossetia, and was taken by surprise when the Russian military moved instead on Abkhazia. Fata said that the reasons behind Russia's actions is that "Putin wants to be seen as a player," to be "a great power like France, Germany, and the UK".

 In early April 2014, Acting President Oleksandr Turchynov stated: "This was an exact plan of Putin on the aggression against Ukraine. Crimea was the beginning. [...] They worked out an aggressive, brutal and cynical technology in the Caucasus. [...] Scenario is the same: provocation is organized, local servicemen respond to it and as a result of military confrontation civilians are killed. Dreadful pictures of dead people and children, regular army is sent to protect people. This scenario was prepared for us. [...] That is why Ukrainian servicemen received an order to hold the line within their military bases and on the ships understanding that they will be provoked to kill civilians."

Statements by Russian analysts

In August 2008, Pavel Felgenhauer, a Moscow-based analyst of military affairs, wrote in Novaya Gazeta that the Russian plan was for the “Ossetians to intentionally provoke the Georgians” so that “any response, harsh or soft, would be used as an occasion for the attack”. He noted that Russia's invasion of Georgia had been planned in advance, with the final political decision to complete the preparations and start the war in August apparently having been made back in April. The war was planned to start no later than the second half of August, because in the following months the weather would deteriorate. The goal of the war was to expel all Georgians from Abkhazia and South Ossetia, to free Tbilisi from Saakashvili, and to force NATO and Americans to abandon the Caucasus region. If the Georgians had not responded to South Ossetian attacks, then Abkhaz separatists would have started the operation to reclaim the Kodori Gorge. But Saakashvili succeeded in destroying the Ossetian militia and Moscow had no other option rather than to confront Georgia itself openly. Felgenhauer also argued in another English-language article that a heavy mortar bombardment of Georgian villages in South Ossetia on 7 August provoked Georgian President Mikheil Saakashvili to order a major assault. The war was not an improvised Russian reaction to a sudden Georgian military offensive in South Ossetia, and "The invasion was inevitable, no matter what the Georgians did." Earlier, on 7 August, Felgenhauer claimed that while Kokoity and other Ossetian officials seemed to be provoking a major Russian intervention into South Ossetia, not everyone in Moscow was "ready to plunge headlong into war." Felgenhauer had predicted in June 2008 that Vladimir Putin would start a war against Georgia in Abkhazia and South Ossetia supposedly in late August 2008.

In August 2008, Aleksandr Golts, a Moscow-based defense analyst said that the blame laid with the Kremlin. "Russia's policies over the past several years caused this war. And for this they bear responsibility."

In August 2008, Georgy Satarov, head of the InDem Foundation, said: "President Medvedev sent troops to the Georgian-Ossetian conflict zone without approval of the Federation Council. This is a grave violation of the Constitution." Satarov claimed that Putin allowed Medvedev to make such mistakes, then later he would impeach Medvedev and organize a new presidential election.

In October 2008, Andrey Illarionov, former advisor to Vladimir Putin, in his interview with Echo of Moscow declared that it was suspicious that the evacuation of almost entire South Ossetian population began on 2 August and was finished before the war, because this had not happened before during the past 20 years of the conflict during the escalations of tensions. After the evacuation of the civilian population, the mobilization of volunteers started in the North Caucasus. Illarionov stated that the war is started with the mobilization. On 3 August the volunteers started to arrive in South Ossetia. Illarionov noted that all the volunteers were registered in the Military commissariats of North Caucasus republics and were organized. On 4 August, several Russian special forces were deployed in South Ossetia. Illarionov also noted that since the late July the Ossetian media was reporting that the war was imminent and that Russian 58th Army would help them. He claimed that on 3 August the third side began to participate in the clashes between the Georgian and South Ossetian forces, firing on both the Georgians and South Ossetians. Illarionov said that the Ossetians do not deny the Georgian reports that on 7 August the Ossetians violated the ceasefire declared by Saakashvili. According to him, by August 2008 South Ossetia had become the most militarised territory per capita in the world, surpassing even North Korea. He also said that the Georgians apparently did not have any plan to invade South Ossetia, only a plan to defend the Georgian villages in South Ossetia.

On 18 November 2008, Russian organisation Memorial said there was abundant evidence that shelling had taken place in the days leading up to August 7 and both sides were involved. The head of Memorial, Oleg Orlov, had spent two weeks in South Ossetia and Georgia investigating the conflict. He said that artillery exchanges across the Georgian-South Ossetian border began on August 1, and then "got worse". Orlov said that South Ossetian troops had fired on civilians, including an enclave of ethnic Georgians inside South Ossetia. South Ossetian troops had also fired from the Tskhinvali headquarters of Russian peacekeeping force. Orlov said: "Of course Georgia's armed forces started a full-scale military operation. But the previous politics of Russia provoked Georgia to do this." He added that "But Russian peacekeepers also didn't do their job properly. We know the Russian side gave arms to the Ossetians and that they used them to fire towards Georgia from Russian peacekeeping positions well before August 7."

In November 2008, Yulia Latynina, Russian journalist, asserted that the war started on 7 August, when the Russian forces which were massed on the Georgian border, crossed the Roki tunnel and entered Georgia. She wrote her own analysis of pre-war events for EJ. She quoted in her work Temur Iakobashvili, Georgian minister, as saying that when Saakashvili was informed of the shelling of the Georgian village of Tamarasheni, he ordered no retaliation; however, the information Saakashvili received next, changed everything: that was of 150 Russian tanks moving towards the Roki tunnel. According to Latynina, if Saakashvilil had known that by then Russian 135th and 693rd regiments were already in Java, his reaction would be different. Latynina argues that Saakashvili was faced with not a strategic, but tactical dilemma: selecting not when to clash with the Russians but where - at night in Tskhinvali or at dawn in Gori (well inside Georgia). Latynina stated that Tamarasheni was shelled in order to liberate the road for the Russian tanks, because they couldn't move towards Gori through Tskhinvali via the Zar road. Latynina concluded that Georgia didn't need small-scale clashes with the separatists, because if the Georgians had had military plans for reintegration of South Ossetia, then they would have needed secrecy. But South Ossetia was in need to shell the enemy, like Hamas or Hezbollah do. The corrupt ruling regime of South Ossetia needed the war. Latynina noted that while Kokoity and Russia had been preparing to defend from the Georgian attack for 4 years, there was no bomb shelter in the headquarters of Russian peacekeepers. Latynina finally concluded that by the time when Russia formally declared that it had entered the war against Georgia, the Russian 58th army (not the peacekeepers), had already been engaged in military clashes: "It is obvious that [on August 8] at 3 pm Russia decided not to start the war but to acknowledge it."

In 2009 Andrey Illarionov in the book 'The Guns of August 2008' authored the chapter The Russian Leadership's Preparation for War, 1999-2008. He wrote that the Russian leadership had taken the decisions that caused the Russo-Georgian war between September 1999 and June 2003. After the appointment of Vladimir Putin in August 1999 as Prime minister, the Russian government changed its attitude towards Georgia. Whatever Saakashvili's government contributions to the deterioration of the Russia-Georgia relations, neither he or his colleagues held positions in the Georgian government before November 2003. Russian authorities had been preparing for the war for nearly a decade. By supplying South Ossetia with heavy military equipment in February 2003, the Russian government chose the military solution to the conflict with Georgia. Mostly the Russian-Abkhaz-South Ossetian coalition made the first moves, to which Georgians responded. He also noted that on 2 August 2008, the Russian journalists started to arrive in Tskhinvali who were ready to report on a war that had not yet begun. By 7 August their number rose to 50.

In July 2009, the Moscow Defence Brief, a magazine published by CAST, an independent Russian think-tank, pointed out that:

Statements by international analysts

On 8 August 2008, Vladimir Socor, the political analyst of Jamestown Foundation wrote that the brazen attacks during the night of August 7 to 8 in South Ossetia left the Georgian Government with no choice but to respond. He stated that continuing the restraint policy would have resulted in irreparable human, territorial, and political losses for Georgia. Georgia’s defensive response in South Ossetia since August 8 was "legally within the country’s rights under international law and militarily commensurate with the attacks." NATO’s failure to grant a MAP to Georgia at the April 2008 summit emboldened Russia to escalate military operations against Georgia.

On 12 August 2008, Ralph Peters wrote that he was "seeing the emergence of a rogue military power with a nuclear arsenal". Russia made it clear that it would not tolerate freedom and self-rule in its neighbours. Russian air force had been trying unsuccessfully to hit the gas pipeline running from the Caspian Sea to the Mediterranean. The Kremlin gave a signal to Europe that it not only had the power to turn off Siberian gas, it could turn off every tap in the region any time. Peters wrote: "Any soldier above the grade of private can tell you that there’s absolutely no way Moscow could have launched this huge ground, air and sea offensive in an instantaneous “response” to alleged Georgian actions." Even to get one armored brigade over the Caucasus Mountains needed extensive preparations. Russia (working through its mercenaries in South Ossetia) was staging brutal provocations against Georgia beginning from late July 2008. Peters compared the Russian attack on Georgia to Hitler’s march into Czechoslovakia. The war in Georgia was supposed to be the big debut for the Kremlin’s revitalized armed forces (funded by the new petroleum-generated wealth), but the war unintentionally revealed many of enduring Russian weaknesses.

On 13 August 2008, George Friedman, US military analyst, and a CEO of a US-based think-tank Stratfor, wrote in the institution's report: "There had been a great deal of shelling by the South Ossetians of Georgian villages for the previous three nights, but while possibly more intense than usual, artillery exchanges were routine. [...] It is very difficult to imagine that the Georgians launched their attack against U.S. wishes. The Georgians rely on the United States, and they were in no position to defy it. [...] the United States either was unaware of the existence of Russian forces, or knew of the Russian forces but -- along with the Georgians -- miscalculated Russia's intentions. [...] Putin did not want to re-establish the Soviet Union, but he did want to re-establish the Russian sphere of influence in the former Soviet Union region. [...] He did not want to confront NATO directly, but he did want to confront and defeat a power that was closely aligned with the United States, had U.S. support, aid and advisers and was widely seen as being under American protection. Georgia was the perfect choice. [...] The war in Georgia, therefore, is Russia's public return to great power status. This is not something that just happened — it has been unfolding ever since Putin took power, and with growing intensity in the past five years."

On 14 August 2008, The Economist wrote that the war in South Ossetia may have been triggered by the Georgians, but it was largely engineered by the Russians, who had over the years fanned the flames of the conflict. Russian response was not sudden response to provocation, but a long-planned move. Russia was also prepared for the war ideologically. Its campaign was crude, yet effective. While Russian forces were dropping bombs on Georgia, Moscow "bombarded" its own population with an "astonishing" (even by Soviet standards) propaganda campaign. After Putin’s arrival in the Kremlin in 2000, Russia started to distribute its passports to Abkhaz and South Ossetians, while also claiming the role of a neutral peacekeeper. When the fighting broke out in August 2008 in Georgia, Russia argued that it had to defend its nationals, while it had killed tens of thousands of its own citizens in Chechnya. In the process of portraying Georgia as a "fascist" country, Russia displayed the syndrome it was condemning. Vladimir Putin won militarily, but all Russia got from its victory was a shattered reputation, broken ties with Georgia, control over the separatist regions (which it already had) and fear from other former Soviet republics.

In August 2008, Steven Blank, a professor of strategic studies at the U.S. Army War College, said that "This is a war that Russia wanted, and clearly had planned for." "The evidence I’ve seen indicates that the Russian Army was sitting there waiting for this, that this was essentially a provocation launched by the South Ossetians, who ratcheted up the level of violence in order to bring the Georgians -- who are easily provokable, obviously -- to attack," he said. "And the Russians were waiting there, ready with an operational plan and with forces in place -- land, sea and air -- to do what they have subsequently done."

On 16 August 2008, journalist Thom Shanker wrote that Russian coordination of ground, joint air and naval operations, cyberattacks on Georgian government Web sites and its best English speakers conducting public-relations campaign did not look accidental to military professionals. "They seem to have harnessed all their instruments of national power — military, diplomatic, information — in a very disciplined way," one Pentagon official was quoted as saying. "It appears this was well thought out and planned in advance, and suggests a level of coordination in the Russian government between the military and the other civilian agencies and departments that we are striving for today." A major Russian ground exercise held in July near the Georgian border, called Caucasus 2008, played out a chain of events like the one carried out in the August war. More than 1,000 American military personnel were in Georgia for an exercise in July. But that exercise prepared a Georgian brigade for duty in Iraq, a different mission from the seizing of territory or countering an aggressor. Shanker noted that Russia had reinforced its peacekeeping force in Abkhazia with advanced artillery in April, and in May it sent troops to fix a railroad line linking Abkhazia with Russia.

In August 2008, Alexander Rahr, Russia expert and a Putin biographer, said that "The war in Georgia has put the European order in question," and "The times are past when you can punish Russia."

On 16 August 2008, Ian Traynor wrote for The Guardian that the war in Georgia was "the biggest victory in eight years of what might be termed Putinism". In pursuit of avenging a long period of Russian humiliation and deploying his limited range of levers to make the world to listen to the Kremlin, the Russian prime minister managed to redraw the geopolitical map. Rather than being the culmination of Putinism, the Russian invasion of Georgia was perceived as the start of something else.

On 25 August 2008, journalist Matthew Continetti argued that whatever were the precise sequence of pre-war events, however Saakashvili did nothing to provide a reason for Putin to invade Georgia proper; or to bomb targets inside Georgia in the days after the initial ceasefire; or to blame Saakashvili with crimes against humanity; or to attempt regime change in a democratic country that abided by international norms. Continetti also denied the claim that the ultimate blame for this conflict laid with the United States and its NATO and EU allies.

On 26 August 2008, Financial Times wrote that "Most accounts agree that it was South Ossetian separatists who committed the first act of escalation when they blew up a Georgian military vehicle on August 1, wounding five Georgian peacekeeping troops." It argued: "So swift was the Russian reaction that some analysts believe that, while it did not appear to precede the Georgian assault on Tskhinvali, as Mr Saakashvili claims, it may have been planned in advance, with Mr Saakashvili simply falling into a well prepared Russian trap."

On 26 August 2008, Michael Totten published the report which contained an interview with an expert Patrick Worms who worked in Tbilisi. Worms's version of events was confirmed by an academic Thomas Goltz. Worms said: "The Ossetians start provoking and provoking and provoking by shelling Georgian positions and Georgian villages around there. And it's a classic tit for tat thing. You shell, I shell back. The Georgians offered repeated ceasefires, which the Ossetians broke. (...) On the 6th of August the shelling intensifies from Ossetian positions. And for the first time since the war finished in 1992, they are using 120mm guns. (...) Because of the peace agreement they had, nobody was allowed to have guns bigger than 80mm. Okay, so that's the formal start of the war. It wasn't the attack on Tskhinvali."

In August 2008, Peter Roudik, Senior Foreign Law Specialist working for the Library of Congress, criticized Russian claim that the Georgian attack on the South Ossetian town of Tskhinvali was "an act of aggression" and Russia’s involvement was an act of assistance in defence against the attacking Georgian troops, saying that an act of aggression can be recognized only by the U.N. Security Council upon evaluation of the circumstances surrounding the military actions. He pointed out that an act of aggression requires use of the armed forces against the sovereignty, territorial integrity, or political independence of another state. South Ossetia remained an integral part of Georgia on 8 August 2008, which excluded the possibility of Georgian aggression against South Ossetia and undermined the use of this justification for Russia’s action.

In August 2008, Svante Cornell, Johanna Popjanevski and Niklas Nilsson from the Swedish Institute for Security and Development Policy commented that preceding the war, "Moscow’s increasingly blatant provocations against Georgia led to a growing fear in the analytic community that it was seeking a military confrontation," adding "Russia had been meticulously preparing an invasion of Georgia through the substantial massing and preparation of forces in the country’s immediate vicinity." The paper pointed out that its assertions were "initial conclusions," and because of the recent nature of the event, the information might possibly need correction as more solid evidence arrived.

According to Cornell, Moscow spent millions in a public-relations campaign to convince the world that Georgia, not Russia, began the war despite abundant evidence, including some in Russian media, to the contrary.

In November 2008, Oleksandr Sushko, deputy director of Center for Peace, Conversion and Foreign Policy of Ukraine, argued: "Russian invasion in Georgia on 08.08.08 changed dramatically security environment in the Eastern Europe by the evident destruction of an international order based on multilateral consensus achieved back in 1991, at the collapse of the USSR." In 2008 Georgia, the country belonging, as viewed by Russia, to the sphere of its "privileged interests" passed over the informal limit of sovereignty imposed by Russia and therefore was punished.

In 2008, Roy Allison, wrote in International Affairs that there is strong evidence that the Russian invasion of South Ossetia and then deeper into Georgia was planned and expected rather than spontaneous and improvised. However, the exact timing of the intervention during August–September "may not have been of Moscow’s choosing", if for example South Ossetian forces were impatient to instigate a conflict in July–August to give Russia a pretext for intervention and could not be effectively controlled. Regarding the events of August 7/8, Allison states that "Moscow’s insistence that its forces did not cross the Georgian border until Russian peacekeepers in Tskhinvali were in severe jeopardy has gained quite wide acceptance internationally. The Georgian claim has, however, been strengthened by the release of telephone intercepts (lost for a month in the chaos of combat) indicating that at least part of a Russian armoured regiment had crossed into South Ossetia by late on 7 August." In the light of the Russian occupation of uncontested Georgian territory, Russian claim to realise the peacekeeping function assumed in the Sochi agreements is described as "increasingly surreal". He noted that "international agreements limited Russia’s peacekeeping role in South Ossetia to monitoring the ceasefire, with no provision for peace enforcement". Russia's goals in the war are described as manyfold: Restoring the security of its peacekeepers and 'citizens' in South Ossetia, the establishment of Abkhazia and South Ossetia as military protectorates, a weakening of Georgia's strategic position (as a means to dissuade NATO from offering a MAP to Georgia and to diminish the attractiveness of the energy transit corridor from the Caspian) and bringing down the government of President Saakashvili.

In 2008, Professor of Political Science Robert O. Freedman argued that the policy demonstrated by Vladimir Putin in his invasion of Georgia "should have come as no surprise to anyone following Putin's foreign policy in the Middle East in the 2005–2008 period, which has clearly displayed the aggressiveness and anti-Americanism so evident in the invasion of Georgia." Putin's support of the anti-American terrorist organizations and rogue states "set the stage for the invasion of Georgia as Putin sought to spread Russian influence throughout the South Caucasus as well as the Middle East." Putin offered Russian citizenship to people living in the separatist regions, and encouraged the South Ossetians to periodically fire artillery shells at Georgian positions outside of South Ossetia, forcing Saakashvili into a military response against the region, thus providing a pretext for Russian military to intervene.

In July 2009, Mohammad Sajjadur Rahman noted that the decisive military move by Russia was the first since the Soviet–Afghan War. The role played by Russia in the 1990s in overseeing the peace process transformed the separatist conflicts into a dispute between Georgia and Russia. Putin's desire to elevate Russia’s Great Power image was "an important indicator of the motivations that guided the decision to engage in war with Georgia." Rahman argued that "Realism, the most dominant theory of International Relations, can be applied in analyzing Russian behavior in this war." Rahman denied the claim that Russia's action was defensive and retaliatory, explaining that long before the war, Russia had established the infrastructure and logistical support for a military invasion. Putin's decision to engage in a war with Georgia was guided by geopolitical interests that Russia sought to advance through a decisive victory. The conflict would act as a deterrent against building any new pipelines from Azerbaijan to Turkey across Georgia. However, the war exposed Russia’s inability to accomplish political objectives without violence. Rahman argued that "Russia’s negligence of the international organizations during the war also indicates the realist worldview of the Kremlin that Russia will act on its own if its interests clash with the desires of the international community." He argued that "both Putin and Saakashvili used identity politics and provoked ethnic/nationalist tensions that led to the outbreak of the war." After the war, Putin became more popular and he was "certainly very much in charge of his country, [...] more than ever." Rahman summarized that "the causes of the August war were indeed complex and multifaceted." The failure of the West to deescalate the tension also contributed to the outbreak of the war.

In 2009, Martin Malek, a researcher at the Institute for Peace Support and Conflict Management of the National Defense Academy in Vienna, noted that in September 2008 Russian Prime Minister Vladimir Putin at the Valdai International Discussion Club told his audience about his meeting with Chinese officials on the day of the opening ceremony of the Olympic Games in Beijing, where he recognised China’s problem with Taiwan and therefore did not press China to recognise the independence of Abkhazia and South Ossetia; Malek concluded that Putin considered the recognition of the independence of Georgia’s separatist regions, at the latest, on 8 August. Malek also wrote that Russia's aim was to prevent Georgia’s restoration of its territorial integrity, humiliate Georgian president Mikheil Saakashvili, intimidate the Georgian nation and damage Georgia’s economy and civilian infrastructure, thus undermining its relevance as a gas and oil transit country. Furthermore, Russia's intention was to send a strong signal to the US, NATO and the EU with the subtext not to "meddle in" the areas belonging to the former Soviet Union, because the Kremlin officially considers them as "zone of vital interests".

In 2009, Kaarel Kaas wrote an article for International Centre for Defense Studies, where he noted that this war was the first time after the fall of the Soviet Union that modern Russia used military force against another sovereign country. The war in Georgia in August sent a clear signal to the world: when necessary, Russia will engage in full-scale conventional warfare against other countries in order to pursue its political interests. The military operation was only one of the phases in a longer-term anti-Georgian campaign. The staffs concerned must have planned the war for months – they had to develop an overall operations plan, to move in the stocks necessary for the battle, to allocate the aviation resources for the deployment of troops to Georgia and other logistic capabilities, to produce a target list for the air force, and so on. The scope and intensity of Russian attack exceeded the forecasts made by the Georgian leadership and the Western countries. The Russians achieved a strategic advantage by using the element of surprise. He pointed out that most of the units deployed against Georgia were from the North Caucasus Military District, whose military capabilities are the greatest in Russia.

In 2009, US Army Colonel George T. Donovan, Jr. wrote that Russia's strategic objectives in the August War could be divided into two categories. The first category included the objectives that did not relate directly to planning a military campaign. With these objectives, Russia wanted to send a strong signal to the West that Russia returned to the world as powerful player, and was willing and able to use military force to protect its interests. A strong message was sent to Ukraine as well as other post-Soviet states with ethnic Russian populations that Russia would take steps to protect them and could use them as a means for expanding its influence and control in the region. The second category included those objectives that pertained directly to operational art since they articulated military requirements for the war. First, Russia wanted to gain control of Abkhazia and South Ossetia. Second, Russia aimed to "demonstrate the tenuous authority of the Georgian government as well as Georgia's economic dependence on Russian cooperation" by humiliating Georgian government through a war and demonstrating that Russia could interdict Georgia’s economy at will. Third, Russia aimed to destroy Georgian armed forces in order to eliminate the threat to the two breakaway regions. The Russian military was likely given some restrictions for the use of force so as not to overly provoke the international community. The Russians acknowledged that a prolonged occupation of Georgia proper would cause a guerilla war; however the Russians did not want to face such a war, because they had already experienced one in Chechnya. Donovan dismissed the assertions that Georgian army should have fought better because it had American equipment and training, explaining that the Georgian military was trained for a different type of war, a counter-insurgency in Iraq.

In 2009, Dr. Mamuka Tsereteli argued that "The Russian invasion of Georgia established new strategic realities in Eastern Europe and Central Eurasia." The war was the culmination of Russia's comeback in Eastern European and Eurasian affairs that occurred "in response to high energy prices, a weak US strategic position, European division and uncertainty in Turkey's strategies." It made clear that Russia was willing to use force for its interests, while western powers were not, and this "was predictable, but not certain to some." The war in Georgia also indicated that "even NATO members may not be fully protected by their commitment to that organization."

In 2010, Janusz Bugajski argued that Vladimir Putin and Dmitry Medvedev were convinced that the West needed Russia much more than Russia needed the West and calculated several advantages could be achieved by attacking Georgia. Although Russia failed to achieve the main goal of overthrowing the Georgian president Mikheil Saakashvili, the Kremlin could manufacture another pretext for a new invasion such as claiming that Georgia is a transit route for Islamic terrorists or is rearming for a new war with Abkhazia and South Ossetia.

In 2011, Dr. Ariel Cohen and Colonel Robert E. Hamilton argued that Russia launched the war against Georgia for geopolitical objectives, which included de facto annexation of Abkhazia, weakening or toppling the Saakashvili government and preventing NATO enlargement. Moscow prepared over 2 and half years for a combined-operations-style invasion of Georgia. The Vladimir Putin-Dmitry Medvedev administration sent a strong signal to Ukraine that the goal of NATO membership may result in dismemberment and a military invasion. The protection of Russian citizens residing in a neighbouring states would lead to a redrawing of the former Soviet borders, including in the Crimea (Ukraine), and possibly in Northern Kazakhstan. If a pro-Russian regime were established in Georgia, it would bring the strategic Baku–Tbilisi–Ceyhan oil pipeline and the Baku–Erzurum gas pipeline under Russian control. The Russian use of pro-Russian separatist proxies to undermine Georgia's independence is not unlike Iran's use of Hezbollah and Hamas in Levant. Cohen and Hamilton concluded that the Russian leadership focused on Georgia as the key element in its strategy to reassert Russian domination in Eurasia.

In 2012, Ariel Cohen argued: "It seems clear that Russia had been preparing for this war for years, and deliberately provoked Georgia through the shooting and shelling of Georgian-controlled villages in South Ossetia."

In 2012, Rick Fawn and Robert Nalbandov wrote that the precise timing of events on the night of 7–8 August 2008 was a substantial study in itself, and depended on "all of the inputs being provable." None of the sides of the conflict saw the events of 7–8 August in isolation, nor presented them as isolated. How those events were interconnected "is essential to determining the story." Fawn and Nalbandov paid attention to the report that during the large-scale military exercise "Kavkaz 2008" in the North Caucasus, which concluded on 4 August, a written notice entitled "Soldier, know your probable enemy" was circulated among the Russian participants; The notice then clarified the enemy as Georgia.
Fawn and Nalbandov argued: "The Russian military measures were part of a Russian strategy and possibly a genuine belief that Moscow was acting in accordance with, and upholding, international law and norms." Fawn and Nalbandov also argued that different events, and different interlinkages, created the story. Every event was used by the sides rhetorically as the "start", which justified retaliation. "An essential characteristic of the conflict in South Ossetia was that, notwithstanding the presence of the Joint Control Commission’s forces as peacekeepers in the conflict zone, each military clash led to mutual blame by the belligerent parties: each side accused the other of opening the first salvo and characterized its actions only as a response." According to Fawn and Nalbandov, "one starting point" for deterioration of the situation in South Ossetia was 7 July when four Georgian officers were seized by South Ossetian authorities. The researchers concluded that "The August war did not come out of nowhere," and "The precise ignition of the war rests on specific timing in the late hours of 7 August and early hours of 8 August, and when and why Russian armor traveled through the Roki tunnel from the Russian Federation into Georgia."

In August 2012, Scott C. Monje, senior editor of the Encyclopedia Americana, argued: "Thus, provocations and incidents had become commonplace over the course of several years, and they frequently occurred in the summer. These generally produced an annual spike in tensions but not open warfare. Some of the events of 2008 were initially seen as repeating the pattern, but this time the consequences were different. [...] Then, on August 6 and 7, South Ossetian militias opened fire with heavy artillery on Georgian villages within the territory." Vladimir Putin's 2012 statement that Russia was prepared for the war and the planning involved South Ossetian militias and that the war began on 6 August (when the militias attacked Georgian villages), suggested that these attacks were part of the plan as a provocation.

In 2013, Lieutenant colonel Riho Ühtegi wrote: "If the Russian side had the intention to bring Georgia to its knees, then it thought the goal had been achieved. Alas, this time it was Russia which was wrong – the military victory did not translate into a political one." He also argued that the war "has drawn unjustifiably little attention in the military analysts’ community, even though it was one of the most genuine lessons in conventional warfare of the past twenty years, has busted quite a few myths and dogmas, and not just from a political perspective, but also in terms of military aspects." He admitted "that to this day it is relatively difficult to obtain information about what really happened at any given moment in 2008." Ühtegi asserted that "even in June 2008 all the signs showed that even if war were to erupt, it would happen in Abkhazia." However the circumstances changed in June 2008, because on the border of South Ossetia skirmishes became more frequent and the Ossetians attacked the Georgian villages in South Ossetia, which was met with Georgian mortar fire. Ühtegi stated "considering the complicated situation in South Caucasus in the summer of 2008, it is difficult to say exactly who started the war. In fact – we should first agree upon how we define starting a war." He agreed with the opinion that "Russian side or rather the Ossetians with support from the Russian forces conducted a multitude of provocations during the summer of 2008, which led to the war." The Russian analysts assessed the international situation adequately and calculated that should Georgia send its regular forces to South Ossetia and should Russia react with a military counterstrike, it would not cause a war between great powers, because first there would be a dispute as to who the aggressor was – Russia or Georgia.

In early 2014, Marcel H. Van Herpen, director of the Cicero Foundation, published the book Putin's Wars: The Rise of Russia's New Imperialism that offered the first systematic analysis of the war in the wider historical context. Van Herpen suggested that although the official Russian narrative (that the war started with a Georgian "surprise" attack on Tskhinvali) became widely accepted, this was not true. The war's history began in 2000. Russian plans to annex Abkhazia already existed in the 1990s. 7–12 August 2008 was the third phase of the war. Illegal incursion of the troops from Russia into South Ossetia before the Georgian military operation began on 7 August, constituted a casus belli. Because of the Russian propaganda, the victim (Georgia) became the aggressor. Van Herpen finished writing the book in late 2013, and predicted "if Ukraine were to opt for deeper integration into the European Union, a Georgia scenario could not be excluded, in which the Kremlin could provoke riots in Eastern Ukraine or the Crimea, where many Russian passport holders live," and could provide the Kremlin with a pretext to intervene and "dismember the country" since Russia would be defending the "Russians" living there.

In April 2014, Jeffrey Mankoff argued: "Saakashvili sought to bring Georgia into NATO and recover both breakaway republics. In response, Moscow encouraged South Ossetian forces to carry out a series of provocations, eventually triggering, in 2008, a Georgian military response and giving Russia a pretext to invade Georgia and formally recognize Abkhazian and South Ossetian independence. [...] Pledges to defend threatened Russian or other minority populations outside Russia may play well domestically, but it was the Azerbaijani, Georgian, and Moldovan governments’ desire to escape Russia’s geopolitical orbit—more than their real or alleged persecution of minorities—that led Moscow to move in. Russia has never intervened militarily to defend ethnic minorities, including Russians, in the former Soviet republics of Central Asia, who have often suffered much more than their co-ethnics in other former Soviet republics, probably because Moscow doesn’t assign the same strategic significance to those Central Asian countries, where Western influence has been limited."

Notes

References

EU Report

External links 
  Войну с Грузией подготовила Россия, и сама же ее начала English translation
  Andrey Illarionov's timeline of the Russo-Georgian War
 Kavkaz-2008 leaflet ("Soldier, know your probable enemy"), The Guns of August 2008: Russia's War in Georgia, p. xi - xii
  How the Russian peacekeepers participated in the aggression against Georgia
 Caucasus Analytical Digest No. 10
 MAIN FINDINGS OF THE “TAGLIAVINI REPORT”
  Review of "A Lost Day"

Russo-Georgian War
Russo-Georgian War